was a Japanese Brazilian visual artist. Her work includes paintings, prints and sculptures. She was one of the main representatives of informal abstractionism in Brazil.

Biography
Ohtake was born in 1913 in Kyoto. In 1936, when she was twenty-three years old, Ohtake traveled to Brazil to visit a brother but could not return to Japan due to the Pacific Theater of World War II occurring there. Ohtake settle in São Paulo with her husband, her son Ruy being born there in 1938 and started painting in 1951, after a visit to the studio of the painter Keisuke Sugano.

She had her first exhibition in 1957, in the Salão Nacional de Arte Moderna, and in 1961 she participated in the São Paulo Biennale. In 1972 she participated in the Prints section of the Venice Biennale and in 1978 of the Tokyo Biennale. She created dozens of public space sculptures from the late eighties; her work has been featured in several cities in Brazil, but especially in the state of São Paulo.

In 1988, Ohtake was awarded the Order of Rio Branco for the public sculpture commemorating the 80th anniversary of Japanese immigration in São Paulo and in 2006 she was awarded the Order of Cultural Merit.

Tomie Ohtake was the mother of architects Ruy Ohtake and Ricardo Ohtake.

She died on 12 February 2015, at the age of 101. She was cremated.

Solo exhibitions

Gallery

See also
 List of centenarians (artists)

References

External links

  Tomie Ohtake Institute

1913 births
2015 deaths
Brazilian centenarians
Brazilian women artists
Brazilian women painters
Japanese centenarians
Japanese emigrants to Brazil
Naturalized citizens of Brazil
People from Kyoto
People from São Paulo
20th-century Brazilian painters
21st-century Brazilian painters
Women centenarians